The 2006 CHA Men's Ice Hockey Tournament was played between March 11 and March 13, 2006, at the Michigan State Fairgrounds Coliseum in Detroit, Michigan. By winning the tournament, Bemidji State received College Hockey America's automatic bid to the 2006 NCAA Men's Division I Ice Hockey Tournament.

Format
The tournament featured six teams. The top two teams from the regular season received byes to the semifinals where they played the winners from the quarterfinal games. The two semifinal winners met in the championship game on March 13, 2006, with the winner receiving an automatic bid to the 2006 NCAA Men's Division I Ice Hockey Tournament.

Conference standings
Note: GP = Games played; W = Wins; L = Losses; T = Ties; PTS = Points; GF = Goals For; GA = Goals Against

Bracket

Note: * denotes overtime period(s)

Tournament awards

All-Star team
Goaltender: Layne Sedevie (Bemidji State)
Defensemen: Andrew Lackner (Niagara), Andrew Martens (Bemidji State)
Forwards: Logan Bittle (Robert Morris), Ted Cook (Niagara), Ryan Miller (Bemidji State)

MVP
Jean-Guy Gervais (Bemidji State)

References

External links
College Hockey America tournament history

CHA Men's Ice Hockey Tournament
Cha Men's Ice Hockey Tournament
College sports tournaments in Michigan
Ice hockey competitions in Detroit
2006 in Detroit